"Girls Night Out" is a song written by Brent Maher and Jeffrey Bullock, and recorded by American country music duo The Judds.  It was released in January 1985 as the second single from the album Why Not Me.  The song was their third number one hit on the country chart.  The single went to number one for one week and spent a total of fourteen weeks on the country chart.

Charts

Weekly charts

Year-end charts

References

1985 singles
1984 songs
The Judds songs
RCA Records singles
Curb Records singles
Songs written by Brent Maher
Song recordings produced by Brent Maher